The 2015–16 Army Black Knights women's basketball team represented the United States Military Academy during the 2015–16 NCAA Division I women's basketball season. The Black Knights, led by tenth year head coach Dave Magarity, played their home games at Christl Arena and were members of the Patriot League. They finished the season 29–3, 17–1 in Patriot League play to share the Patriot League regular season title with Bucknell. They won the Patriot League women's tournament to earn an automatic trip to the NCAA women's tournament where they lost to Syracuse in the first round.

Roster

Schedule

|-
!colspan=9 style="background:#000000; color:#D6C499;"| Non-conference regular season

|-
!colspan=9 style="background:#000000; color:#D6C499;"| Patriot League regular season

|-
!colspan=9 style="background:#000000; color:#D6C499;"| Patriot League Women's Tournament

|-
!colspan=9 style="background:#000000; color:#D6C499;"| NCAA Women's Tournament

Rankings
2015–16 NCAA Division I women's basketball rankings

See also
2015–16 Army Black Knights men's basketball team

References

Army
Army Black Knights women's basketball seasons
Army
2015 in sports in New York (state)
2016 in sports in New York (state)